Pleasant Hill is an unincorporated community in Cowlitz County, Washington, south of the city of Castle Rock. Pleasant Hill is located along or near Pleasant Hill Road between Castle Rock and Ostrander. The northern end of Pleasant Hill community is part of the Castle Rock School District, while the southern end is part of the Kelso School District.

Geography
Pleasant Hill is located at  (46.2253898, -122.8940015).

External links
Castle Rock School District website
Kelso School District website

References

Unincorporated communities in Cowlitz County, Washington
Unincorporated communities in Washington (state)